Rajkumar Singh is an Indian politician from Bihar and a Member of the Bihar Legislative Assembly. Singh won the Matihani Assembly constituency on Lok Janshakti Party ticket in the 2020 Bihar Legislative Assembly election. He belongs to Bhumihar caste, but after few months he switched to Janata Dal (United).

References

Living people
Bihar MLAs 2020–2025
Lok Janshakti Party politicians
Year of birth missing (living people)
Janata Dal (United) politicians
People from Begusarai district